Jinanqiao or Jin'anqiao may refer to:

Jinanqiao Dam, or Jin'anqiao Dam, in Yunnan Province, China
Jin'anqiao station, a station of Beijing Subway, in China